Nemotaulius is a genus of northern caddisflies in the family Limnephilidae. There are about eight described species in Nemotaulius.

Species
These eight species belong to the genus Nemotaulius:
 Nemotaulius admorsus (McLachlan, 1866)
 Nemotaulius amurensis Nimmo, 1995
 Nemotaulius brevilinea (McLachlan, 1871)
 Nemotaulius coreanus Olah, 1985
 Nemotaulius hostilis (Hagen, 1873)
 Nemotaulius miyakei (Nakahara, 1914)
 Nemotaulius mutatus (McLachlan, 1872)
 Nemotaulius punctatolineatus (Retzius, 1783)

References

Further reading

 
 
 

Trichoptera genera
Articles created by Qbugbot
Integripalpia